Paaske is a surname. Notable people with the surname include:

Carl Paaske (1890–1970), Norwegian pentathlete
Else Paaske (born 1941), Danish singer and educator
Erik Paaske (1933–1992), Danish singer and actor
Lars Paaske (born 1976), Danish badminton player

Other
Easter